This article contains information about the literary events and publications of 1762.

Events
April 27 – Rev. Hugh Blair is appointed first Professor of Rhetoric and Belles Lettres at the University of Edinburgh by King George III, the first such chair in English literature.
June 19 – Jean-Jacques Rousseau's The Social Contract (Du Contrat social, ou Principes du droit politique) and Emile, or On Education (Émile, ou De l’éducation), recently published in Amsterdam and The Hague respectively, are publicly burned in Paris. They are also prohibited in Rousseau's native Republic of Geneva. 
June 20 – In Paris, the Comédie-Italienne, having merged with the Opéra-Comique, performs at the Hôtel de Bourgogne.
The Sorbonne library is founded. 
The Académie française produces a new edition of its dictionary of the French language, the fourth to be published.
Benjamin Victor's adaptation of The Two Gentlemen of Verona (with expanded roles for the clown Launce and his dog) is staged by David Garrick at Drury Lane, and runs for five nights. It is the earliest known performance of that Shakespearean play in any form.
Christoph Martin Wieland begins publishing his prose translations of 22 Shakespearean plays, the first translations of them into German (in 8 volumes, through 1766).

New books

Fiction
John Cleland (attributed)  – The Romance of a Night 
Oliver Goldsmith – The Citizen of the World
Charles Johnstone – The Reverie
John Langhorne – Solyman and Almena
Thomas Leland – Longsword, Earl of Salisbury: An Historical Romance
Charlotte Lennox – Sophia
Sarah Scott – Millenium  Hall and the Country Adjacent
Tobias Smollett – The Life and Adventures of Sir Launcelot Greaves
Laurence Sterne – The Life and Opinions of Tristram Shandy, Gentleman (vols. v–vi)

Drama
John Delap – Hecuba
Nicolás Fernandez de Moratín – La petimetra
Samuel Foote – The Orators
David Garrick – Cymbeline (adapted)
Carlo Goldoni – Le baruffe chiozzotte (The Brawl in Chioggia)
Carlo Gozzi – Turandot
Charlotte Lennox – The Sister
Hannah More – The Search after Happiness ("for young ladies to act")
William Whitehead – The School for Lovers

Poetry

James Boswell – The Cub at Newmarket
Elizabeth Carter – Poems on Several Occasions
Charles Churchill – The Ghost (books i–ii)
Mary Collier – Poems
John Cunningham – The Contemplatist
Tomás Antônio Gonzaga – Marília de Dirceu
Edward Jerningham – The Nunnery
Robert Lloyd – Poems
James Macpherson as "Ossian" – Fingal
William Whitehead – A Charge to the Poets
Edward Young – Resignation

Non-fiction
The North Briton (newspaper)
George Campbell – A Dissertation on Miracles
Jacques Cazotte – Ollivier.
Denis Diderot
Éloge de Richardson
Rameau's Nephew (Le Neveu de Rameau ou La Satire seconde; completed; first published 1805)
Nicolas Fernández de Moratín – Desengaños al teatro español
Henry Fielding – Works
Oliver Goldsmith
The Life of Richard Nash
The Mystery Revealed (on the Cock Lane Ghost)
Paisiy Hilendarski – Istoriya Slavyanobolgarskaya (Slavonic-Bulgarian History)
Henry Home – Elements of Criticism
Richard Hurd – Letters on Chivalry and Romance
William Kenrick – Emilius and Sophia (translation of Rousseau)
John Langhorne – Letters on Religious Retirement, Melancholy and Enthusiasm
Robert Lowth – A Short Introduction to English Grammar
William Williams Pantycelyn – Llythyr Martha Philopur at y Parchedig Philo Evangelius eu hathro (Martha Philopur's letter to the Reverend Philo Evangelius, her teacher)
John Parkhurst – An Hebrew and English Lexicon
Joseph Priestley – A Course of Lectures on the Theory of Language, and Universal Grammar
Jean-Jacques Rousseau
The Social Contract
Emile, or On Education
Horace Walpole – Anecdotes of Painting in England, Volume 1

Births
January 11 – Andrew Cherry, Irish playwright and actor-manager (died 1812)
May 19 – Johann Gottlieb Fichte, German philosopher (died 1814)
September 11 – Joanna Baillie, Scottish poet and dramatist (died 1851)
September 24 – William Lisle Bowles, English poet and critic (died 1850)
October 30 – André Chénier, French poet (guillotined 1794)
Susanna Rowson née Haswell, English-born American novelist, poet, playwright, religious writer, actress, educator and abolitionist (died 1824)

Deaths
May 26 – Alexander Gottlieb Baumgarten, German philosopher (born 1714)
June 17 – Prosper Jolyot de Crébillon, French poet and tragedian (born 1674)
June 26 – Luise Gottsched, German poet, comic playwright and translator (born 1713)
August 21 – Lady Mary Wortley Montagu, English letter writer and poet (born 1698)
October 14 – Hieronymus Pez, Austrian historian and monastic librarian (born 1685)

References

 
Years of the 18th century in literature